Swimming at the 2019 European Youth Summer Olympic Festival was held at the Baku Aquatics Center in Baku, Azerbaijan, from 22 to 26 July 2019.

Medalists

Boys

 Swimmers who participated in the heats only and received medals.

Women

 Swimmers who participated in the heats only and received medals.

Mixed

 Swimmers who participated in the heats only and received medals.

Medal table

References

External links

European Youth Summer Olympic Festival
Swimming
2019
2019 European Youth